FMG Insurance (formerly Farmers' Mutual Group) is a mutual insurance company in New Zealand that was established from a merger of the Farmers' Mutual Insurance Association, Taranaki Farmers' Mutual Insurance Association and Primary Industries Insurance Company Limited in 1978. The company is incorporated under the Farmers’ Mutual Group Act 2007 and can trace its origins back to the original farmers' fire mutual organisations established in 1905.

Sponsorship
FMG is currently sponsors of the following organisations:
 FMG Stadium Waikato - Hamilton's major sporting and cultural events venue 
 Angus NZ - the New Zealand Angus Association. 
 ESNZ - Equestrian Sports New Zealand 
 New Zealand Nuffield Farming Scholarships - one of New Zealand's most prestigious farming awards.

FMG formerly held naming rights to Arena 1 in Palmerston North, Arena Manawatu's main outdoor venue. It held naming rights from 2005 until 2015.

References

External links

Financial services companies established in 1978
Companies based in Wellington
Insurance companies of New Zealand